Chlorurus troschelii, commonly known as Troschel's parrotfish, is a species of marine ray-finned fish, a parrotfish from the family Scaridae. It is native to the eastern Indian Ocean, where it lives in coral reefs.

Etymology
The fish is named in honor of zoologist Franz Hermann Troschel (1810-1882)

References

Fish of the Indian Ocean
Taxa named by Pieter Bleeker
Fish described in 1853
troschelii